Paris Photo is an annual international art fair dedicated to photography. Founded in 1997, Paris Photo is held in November at the Grand Palais exhibition hall and museum complex, located at the Champs-Élysées in the 8th arrondissement in Paris.

The event offers a selection of photo-based artworks from galleries alongside a public programme of exhibitions, prizes, art signings and talks.

The Fair currently presents four exhibition sectors: the main gallery sector with solo and group shows and thematic projects, the Prisms sector devoted to large-format series and installation works, the video sector with moving images, and the Book sector with publishers and dealers.

History
Founded in 1997, Paris Photo presented 53 galleries for its first edition at the Carrousel du Louvre. The Fair was acquired by Reed expositions France in 2001 and relocated to the Grand Palais in 2011.

In 2006, public attendance was 40,000. In 2017, over 64,500 visitors attended over the course of the 5-day fair.

Florence Bourgeois is its current director alongside Christopher Wiesner, Artistic Director. She was preceded by Julien Frydman (2011–2015), Guillaume Piens (2008–2010), Valerie Foujerole (2005–2007) and Rik Gadella (1997–2004).

Reed Exhibitions also organised two sister editions of Paris Photo: Paris Photo Los Angeles from 2013 through 2015 at the Paramount Pictures Studios in Hollywood and Photo London at Old Billings Gate in 2007. The inaugural edition in New York City was postponed in 2020 due to the COVID-19 pandemic. The artwork was displayed online instead.

The Paris Photo–Aperture Foundation PhotoBook Awards

Initiated in November 2012 by Aperture Foundation and Paris Photo, The PhotoBook Awards has three major categories: First PhotoBook, PhotoBook of the Year, and Photography Catalogue of the Year.

After a call for submissions, a shortlist is selected by a preliminary jury. The shortlisted books are exhibited at Paris Photo and profiled in The PhotoBook Review, Aperture's biannual publication dedicated to the photo book, which is released at Paris Photo and distributed through Aperture magazine. A final jury announces the three category winners at the Fair. The winner of the First PhotoBook category receives a $10,000 prize. The winners of the other two categories each receive a commemorative award.

2016 Award Winners
PhotoBook of the Year: Gregory Halpern, ZZYZX. Publisher: Mack, London, 2016. Designed by Lewis Chaplin
First PhotoBook ($10,000 prize): Michael Christopher Brown, Libyan Sugar. Publisher: Twin Palms Publishers, Santa Fe, NM, 2016. Designed by Brown and Ramon Pez
Photography Catalogue of the Year: Karolina Puchała-Rojek and Karolina Ziębińska-Lewandowska, Wojciech Zamecznik: Photo-graphics. Publisher: Fundacja Archeologia Fotografii, Warsaw, 2015 Designed by Anna Piwowar and Magdalena Piwowar.
Special Jurors’ Mention: Annett Gröschner and Arwed Messmer, Taking Stock of Power: An Other View of the Berlin Wall. Publisher: Hatje Cantz, Ostfildern, Germany, 2016. Designed by Carsten Eisfeld

2017 Award winners
PhotoBook of the Year: Dayanita Singh, Museum Bhavan. Publisher: Steidl, Göttingen, Germany, 2017. Designed by Singh and Gerhard Steidl
First PhotoBook ($10,000 prize): Mathieu Asselin, Monsanto: A Photographic Investigation. Publisher: Kettler/Acte Sud, Dortmund, Germany, 2017. Designed by Ricardo Báez
Photography Catalogue of the Year: Mattie Boom, Hans Rooseboom, New Realities: Photography in the 19th Century. Publisher: Rijiksmuseum/Nai, Amsterdam, 2017. Designed by Irma Boom Office (Irma Boom/Tariq Heijboer)
Juror's Special Mention: Carlos Spottorno and Guillermo Abril, La Grieta (The Crack). Publisher: Astiberri, Bilbao, Spain, 2016

Initiatives
Carte Blanche – Students

In 2017, Paris Photo launched Carte Blanche – Students in partnership with Picto Foundation and Gares & Connexions, in order to promote emerging talent within European schools for photography and the visual arts. Four people were selected by an international jury, then invited to present their work to Paris Photo audiences at the Grand Palais and as part of an installation at Paris Gare du Nord train station.

2017 Laureates: Alexey Shlyk: Academy of Fine Arts, Antwerp, Belgium; George Selley: College of Communication (University of the Arts London), London; Leon Billerbeck: Bauhaus University Weimar, Germany; William Lakin: Middlesex University, UK

See also
 French art salons and academies

References

External links

Arts festivals in Paris
Photography festivals
Annual events in Paris
Art museums and galleries in Paris
Photography in France
Photography exhibitions
1997 in art
1997 establishments in France
Recurring events established in 1997